The Holmenkollen 50 km is an annual cross-country skiing race held at Holmenkollen National Arena in Oslo, Norway. The competition is part of the Holmenkollen Ski Festival. Previous to 2023 The 50 km distance is raced by men only as the women's equivalent is a 30 km race. Starting in 2023 both men and women will race 50k.

History
The first 50 km race in Oslo was planned to be part of Husebyrennet i 1887, but was first held in 1888. Torjus Hemmestveit won the inaugural 50 km race. 17 skiers started the race, 12 finished. The course consisted of two laps of 25 km and started at the velodrome at Majorstuen.

The next long-distance race, a 30 km, was planned to be part of Holmenkollrennene in 1898, but was cancelled due to lack of snow. 30 km races were held in 1900 and 1901, and the winners of these races are widely recognised as Holmenkollen 50 km winners. Also the winner of the 1907 edition is recognised as a winner, even though the course length was only 40 km. The first Holmenkollen 50 km race was held in 1902. The course consisted of two laps of 25 kilometres, both started and finished at Frognerseteren. For safety reasons, all skiers had to stop for a five-minute rest. These required pauses was only mandatory in the 1902 edition.

In 1905, the 50 km race was again cancelled due to lack of snow. Holmenkollrennene (later known as Holmenkollen Ski Festival) were in 1909 a part of a common arrangement with the first Norwegian Championships in cross-country skiing, and since a 30 km race was held at Lillehammer in these championships, the 50 km race in Holmenkollen was not held. The first foreign competitors at the Holmenkollen 50 km were a number of Swedes participating in 1903. The first non-Norwegian to win the race was Finnish skier Anton Collin in 1922. Tapani Niku, also from Finland, finished in second place.

In 1925 was the 50 km cancelled due to lack of snow in the days before Holmenkollrennene. Holmenkollrennene was threatened by lack of snow also in 1932, but was held two weeks after schedule. Holmenkollrennene, including the 50 km were not held during the Second World War.

Oslo arranged the World Championships in 1930, 1966, 1982 and 2011. In all the World Championships held in Oslo, the Holmenkollen 50 km was arranged as a part of the World Championships. In 1952, a separate 50 km race was held two weeks after the 1952 Winter Olympics in Oslo. The individual races in the 1982 World Championships were a part of the 1981–82 Cross-Country World Cup, the first official World Cup season, and the Holmenkollen 50 km race has since been a part of the World Cup, with the exception in 1985 when the 50 km did not have World Cup status. The cross-country skiing events at the 2011 World Championships were not part of the World Cup, unlike the 1982 World Championships.

In the 1985–86 season, cross-country skiing started to distinguish techniques and arrange separate races in classic style and freestyle (skating). The 50 km in Holmenkollen has since been arranged in both techniques. Lack of snow hindered the Holmenkollrennene again in 1990 and 1992, which caused the 50 km to be moved to Vang. Lillehammer hosted the 1994 Winter Olympics, and no 50 km race was held in Holmenkollen that year. The Holmenkollen National Arena was reconstructed in 2009 to prepare for the 2011 World Championships and the 50 km was therefore replaced by a World Cup race in Trondheim. Since 2010, the Holmenkollen 50 km has been competed with a mass start.

Records
Lauritz Bergendahl has the three biggest winning margins in the Holmenkollen 50 km. In 1914, he won by 22 minutes 39 seconds down to Elling Rønes. The following year, Bergendahl skied 21 minutes 36 seconds faster than second-placed Embret Mellesmo. He won by 17 minutes and 15 seconds down to Truls Braathen in 1912. The smallest winning margin from races held with individual start are the two seconds between winner Veikko Hakulinen and Pavel Kolchin in 1955. In mass starts, where the winning margins often are small, the smallest winning margin is a photo finish in 2015 where Sjur Røthe won ahead of Dario Cologna even though they finished in the same time.

The longest winning time for 50 km in Holmenkollen is 5 hours 33 minutes 37 seconds, when Elling Rønes won in 1906. The shortest winning time is Sjur Røthe's time in 2015: 1:54.44,9.

Alexander Bolshunov is the youngest winner of the race, aged 22 years and 68 days when winning the 2019 edition.

Thorleif Haug has the most victories with six; in 1918, 1919, 1920, 1921, 1923 and 1924. Lauritz Bergendahl won five times; in 1910, 1912, 1913, 1914 and 1915. Elling Rønes won four times; 1906, 1907, 1908 and 1916. After the Second World War, five skiers have won three times each: Veikko Hakulinen won in 1952 (Olympic Games), 1953 and 1955, Sverre Stensheim won in 1959, 1960 and 1961, Oddvar Brå won in 1975, 1979 and 1981, Thomas Wassberg won in 1980, 1982 and 1987, and Vegard Ulvang won in 1989, 1991 and 1992.

Multiple winners

The following skiers have won the Holmenkollen 50 km at least twice.

Results
The distance is 50 km unless otherwise noted. The 1888 50 km race was a part of Husebyrennet, but is included in this list for completeness reasons.

See also
List of multiple winners at the Holmenkollen Ski Festival

Sources
Jakob Vaage, Tom Kristensen: Holmenkollen – Historien og resultatene. De norske Bokklubbene, Stabekk 1992.  (p. 191-205 og 247-259, digitalised by Nasjonalbiblioteket)
Foreningen til Ski-Idrættens Fremme gjennem 50 år 1883-1933. Dybwad, Oslo 1933 (s. 32-34, 52, 54-86, 236-238, digitalised by Nasjonalbiblioteket)
Erling Ranheim (red.): Norske skiløpere - Skihistorisk oppslagsverk i 5 bind - Østlandet Sør. Skiforlaget - Erling Ranheim, Oslo 1956 (p. 38-39 og 120, digitalised by Nasjonalbiblioteket)
FIS: Resultater (accessed 15 March 2015)

References

FIS Cross-Country World Cup
Cross-country skiing competitions in Norway
Sport in Oslo
1898 establishments in Norway
Recurring sporting events established in 1898